Snailsbury Tales is a children's cartoon broadcast on the BBC (on both the CBBC channel and its BBC Two slot) between 2002 and 2005 and moved to Tiny Pop between 2006 and 2010. It was produced by Maverick Entertainment.

The cartoon was about a town whose inhabitants were all snails. Much of the humour derived from the fact that it would take 10 days to visit the shops, or that the fire service was proud of their ability to move at 0.1 mph.

The shows voice cast featured Jon Culshaw as the narrator and additional voices, alongside David Holt, Sheila Steafel and Mike Hurley providing the female characters and other additional voices such as the children.  Backgrounds were drawn by Matt Cooley, an art teacher at Wanstead High School.

Snailsbury Tales episodes
 The Maze
 Aerial Photography
 Drought
 The First Snail in Space
 Tooth Fairy
 Mobile Phones
 Old Age
 Pet Show
 Shell Shock
 Nature Walk
 Musician of the Year
 Genie
 The Mystery of Snailsbury Pond
 Skateboard
 Snail's Pace
 Off to the Circus
 Burglary
 Something in the Water
 Mighty Snail
 Ghost
 Snow
 Town Hall Dance
 Cross Country
 Disco
 Gone with the Wind
 Radio Cabbage
 Monster

References

British children's animated television shows
BBC children's television shows
Fictional gastropods
Animated television series about animals